Krisana Kraisintu is a Thai professor and pharmacist, as known as the  "Gypsy pharmacist". She was pharmaceutical consultant in the local production and increased access to life-saving medicines in Africa, in particular,  malaria and HIV/AIDS-related drug production.

She was formerly Director of Research and Development Institute of the Government Pharmaceutical Organization (GPO), Ministry of Public Health, Thailand. Between 2002–2007 Kraisintu worked as a pharmaceutical consultant for Action Medeor, a German aid organization dealing with the production and distribution of medicines in Africa.

Kraisintu is the Honorary Dean of the Faculty of Oriental Medicines, Rangsit University, and a visiting professor at the Faculty of Pharmaceutical Sciences, Ubon Ratchathani University, Thailand. She is also a visiting professor of oriental medicines at the Harbin Institute of Technology, China.

In 2009, she was given the Ramon Magsaysay Award.

HIV/AIDS drugs
Krisana conducted research on anti-retroviral drugs without much support and successfully formulated a generic version of  zidovudine (AZT), which treats HIV and reduces the risk of mother-to-child transmission, in 1995. The product was introduced to the market at a fraction of the cost of the branded product. Her achievement raised the pharmaceutical and health profile of Thailand as the first developing country to manufacture generic HIV/AIDS drugs.

Education
Kraisintu earned her bachelor's degree in pharmacy from Chiang Mai University, Thailand in 1975; a MSc in pharmaceutical analysis from Strathclyde University in 1978; and aPhD in pharmaceutical chemistry from the University of Bath in 1981. She was also awarded an Honorary DSc (Doctor of Science) from the University of Bath in 2009.

He has worked in the pharmaceutical industry in various roles of quality assurance, manufacturing, research and development and business development for the discovery, development, and commercialization of chemical and natural pharmaceutical products.

Honors

References

External links
2009 Magsaysay Awardees
One Woman’s Quest To Fight AIDS

Living people
Ramon Magsaysay Award winners
1952 births
Krisana Kraisintu
Krisana Kraisintu
Krisana Kraisintu
Krisana Kraisintu
Women pharmacists
Krisana Kraisintu
Academic staff of Harbin Institute of Technology